The Cedros Island mule deer (Odocoileus hemionus cerrosensis) is a subspecies of mule deer found only on Cedros Island off the coast of Baja California. Only about 50 individuals remain, with no captive population. Its behavior is similar to that of other subspecies of mule deer. The subspecies is threatened by feral dogs and poaching.

Anatomy 
The Cedros island mule deer shows a reduction in body size and antler size compared to mainland deer, which is an effect of isolation in a relatively small island, according to the "island rule" of Leigh Van Valen. There are also differences in fur coloration which distinguish cerrosensis from other mule deer, but most closely resembling Odocoileus hemionus  fuliginatus.

Subspecies classification 
Cerrosensis is one of the ten named subspecies of mule deer. Although it may be a may be synonyms of O. h. eremicus or O. h. peninsulae, studies based on DNA samples, rather than observation, can show clearer objective differences. In the case of the Cedros deer, its status as a valid subspecies can be defended due to their endemicity to the island, morphological differences, and distinct mitochondrial patterns.

Distribution 
Cedros deer primarily occupy the northern side of the island, being less common in the southern section, where  human activity is more prevalent.

See also
California mule deer
Black-tailed deer
Sitka deer
White-tailed deer

References

Deer
Endemic mammals of Mexico
Endemic fauna of the Baja California Peninsula
Mule